The 2013 Vanderbilt Commodores baseball team represented Vanderbilt University in the 2013 NCAA Division I baseball season.  The team played its home games at Hawkins Field in Nashville, Tennessee.  The team was coached by Tim Corbin in his eleventh season at Vanderbilt.  The Commodores claimed the East Division championship in the Southeastern Conference.

Roster

Coaches

Schedule

Ranking movements

References

Vanderbilt
Vanderbilt Commodores baseball seasons
2013 NCAA Division I baseball tournament participants
Vanderbilt Commodores baseball